WJVA-LP (106.5 FM, "WJVA radio") is a radio station licensed to serve the community of Portsmouth, Virginia. The station is owned by Juneteenth Festival Company and airs a variety format.

The station was assigned the WJVA-LP call letters by the Federal Communications Commission on October 31, 2014.

References

External links
 Official Website
 FCC Public Inspection File for WJVA-LP
 

JVA-LP
JVA-LP
Radio stations established in 2017
2017 establishments in Virginia
Variety radio stations in the United States
Portsmouth, Virginia